DHX Cookie Jar Inc. (also known as Cookie Jar Group, originally known as CINAR, formerly known as Cookie Jar Entertainment Inc., or simply just Cookie Jar) was a Canadian media production and distribution company owned by DHX Media. The company was first established in 1976 as CINAR Films Inc., a Montreal-based studio that was heavily involved in children's entertainment. The company's business model, which included the licensing of its properties into educational markets, had a significant impact on its success; by 1999, CINAR held CDN$1.5 billion of the overall children's television market.

In the 2000s, CINAR became the subject of multiple business scandals, including accusations that the company had used offshore accounts to transfer money out of the company, had plagiarized the concept of one of its series, and had obfuscated the involvement of U.S. screenwriters in its productions in order to continue receiving Canadian tax credits for domestic productions. Over a decade later, these scandals would result in criminal charges, convictions, and fines for four suspects, which included two executives at the company, co-founder Ronald A. Weinberg and chief financial officer Hasanain Panju.

CINAR was sold in 2004 for $190 million to a group led by Michael Hirsh, the founder of Nelvana, and changed its name to Cookie Jar Group. In 2008, they agreed to acquire DIC Entertainment, expanding its library. On August 20, 2012, DHX Media announced its intent to acquire Cookie Jar, in a deal that would make DHX the largest independent owner of children's television programming, and by December 25, 2014, Cookie Jar was folded into DHX Media.

History

CINAR 

After their meeting in New Orleans, Louisiana, in 1976, Micheline Charest and Ronald A. Weinberg organized an event for a women's film festival and worked at distributing foreign films to U.S. theatres. The couple moved to New York City and formed CINAR, a film and television distribution company.

In 1984, CINAR changed their focus from media distribution to production and moved operations to Montreal, Quebec, where they concentrated on family-oriented television programming, including The Little Lulu Show, Animal Crackers, The Secret World of Santa Claus, Emily of New Moon, Mona the Vampire, and The Wombles, as well as the English and French dubs of the anime series Adventures of the Little Koala, Ronin Warriors, The Adventures of Shimajiro, The Adventures of Albert and Sidney, Anpanbread Man, the Saban dub and YTV reruns and airings of Maya the Bee and The Wonderful Wizard of Oz, the Spanish television series The World of David the Gnome, and the English dub of Ultraseven. As a production company, CINAR was also involved in the work of Are You Afraid of the Dark?, The Busy World of Richard Scarry, Madeline (specials 2 to 6), The Real Story of Happy Birthday to You, The Adventures of Paddington Bear, Space Cases, The Shoe People, and its most well-known work, Arthur, Zoboomafoo, and Caillou.

The firm became a public company in September 1993. By 1999, CINAR boasted annual revenues of $150 million (CAD) and owned about $1.5 billion (CAD) of the children's television market. In 1996, CINAR acquired the library of British animation studio FilmFair, and closed it in 1998. In February 1999, CINAR acquired the film library of Leucadia Film Corporation, with the company's acquisition of 55 titles in the WonderWorks library following at the end of the year. It is unknown if the present-day WildBrain retained CINAR's rights to the Leucadia library, though the company's rights to the WonderWorks specials have since lapsed over to Questar Entertainment sometime in the 2000s. CINAR also owned the dubbing studio Fandango Studios in Mexico City.

Scandal 

The success of Charest, Weinberg, and CINAR ended in March 2000, when an internal audit revealed that about $167 million (CAD) was invested into Bahamian bank accounts without the board members' approval. CINAR had also paid U.S. screenwriters for work while continuing to accept federal grants and tax credits for the production of Canadian content. The names of Canadian citizens (generally non-writers connected to CINAR, including Charest's sister Helene) were credited for the works. While the province of Quebec did not file criminal charges, CINAR denied any wrongdoing, choosing instead to pay a settlement to Canadian and Quebec tax authorities of $17.8 million (CAD) and another $2.6 million (CAD) to Telefilm Canada, a Canadian federal funding agency. The value of CINAR's stock plummeted, and the company was soon delisted.

There was some speculation that Hasanain Panju, CFO was the mastermind behind the investment scheme along with John Xanthoudakis of Norshield Investment Group and Lino Matteo of Mount Real Corporation. It was claimed that Charest and Weinberg (and later Panju) used CINAR as a 'piggy bank' and schemed to transfer funds out from the company through a series of complicated transactions to their own offshore holding companies.

In 2001, as part of a settlement agreement with the Commission des Valeurs Mobilières du Québec (Quebec Securities Commission), Charest and Weinberg agreed to pay $1 million each and were banned from serving in the capacity of directors or officers at any publicly traded Canadian company for five years. There was no admission of guilt and none of the allegations has been proven in court. Charest never lived to see a possible outcome, as she died on April 14, 2004.

On March 10, 2011, Weinberg was arrested for securities fraud after a warrant was issued for him to be taken into custody earlier that month. On June 22, 2016, Weinberg was sentenced to 8 years and 11 months in prison, and the other two received sentences of 7 years and 11 months each. On May 3, 2019, he was fully paroled.

As Cookie Jar Group 
In March 2004, CINAR was purchased for more than CA$190 million by a group led by Nelvana founder Michael Hirsh, and former Nelvana president Toper Taylor. The company was subsequently renamed Cookie Jar.

On June 20, 2008, Cookie Jar Group announced a deal to acquire DIC Entertainment. On July 23, 2008, the acquisition was completed, and eventually DIC was folded into Cookie Jar's entertainment division. When Cookie Jar acquired DIC Entertainment, Cookie Jar also acquired Copyright Promotions Licensing Group and a one-third interest in international children's television channel, KidsCo. Cookie Jar now has more than 6,000 half-hours of programming as well as rights to several children's brands. Also, it was announced that Cookie Jar was in negotiation with American Greetings to buy the Care Bears, Strawberry Shortcake, and Sushi Pack franchises. The deal was not finalized yet in late 2008 and with the current scenario, the transaction did not progress. On March 30, 2009, Cookie Jar made a $76 million counter bid for Care Bears and Strawberry Shortcake. Cookie Jar had until April 30, 2009, to complete a deal with American Greetings. In May 2009, American Greetings filed a $100 million lawsuit against Cookie Jar and the company filed a $25 million lawsuit against American Greetings over the Care Bears and Strawberry Shortcake deal.

In April 2009, the company hired Tom Mazza, formerly of TriStar Television and Paramount Television, as its executive vice president of worldwide television. Mazza planned to broaden Cookie Jar's slate by pursuing Canadian co-productions intended for global saley. In February 2011, Cookie Jar announced a new imprint known as The Jar, which it intended to use on series targeting U.S. primetime television; its development slate included Lori Kirkland Baker's All Over You for Lifetime, Blah Girls for MTV, Andrew Orenstein's Lords of the Playground for CBS, and Steven E. de Souza's Spyburbia for Fox and Global.

Acquisition by DHX Media 
On August 20, 2012, DHX Media announced that they would acquire Cookie Jar Group for $111 million; the purchase made DHX the world's largest independent owner of children's television programming. The acquisition was completed on October 22, 2012.

Season 6 of Johnny Test was produced by Cookie Jar under the auspices of DHX Media after the merger, and the studio officially closed down after said series concluded its run on December 25, 2014.

Television

Cookie Jar TV 

At the time of Cookie Jar's acquisition of the company, DIC had been programming a weekend morning block for CBS known as KEWLopolis. On February 24, 2009, it was announced that CBS had renewed its contract with Cookie Jar for the block through 2012. For the 2009–10 television season, the block was re-branded as Cookie Jar TV. Cookie Jar TV was discontinued after the 2012–13 television season; it was succeeded in 2013–14 by CBS Dream Team, which is programmed by Litton Entertainment.

Cookie Jar Toons 

On November 1, 2008, This TV launched airing Cookie Jar's daily children's programming block Cookie Jar Toons which provided children's and E/I-oriented programming.

Cookie Jar Kids Network 

Cookie Jar Kids Network (formerly DIC Kids Network) was a children's programming block that aired selected Cookie Jar programs on local Fox, MyNetworkTV, and independent stations to provide them with a source of educational and informational (E/I) programming required by American broadcast standards. Syndicated by Ascent Media, it ceased broadcasting on September 18, 2011.

References

External links 
 Official website (archived)
 Jaroo Official Streaming Episodes Site
 A history of the studio (1998) from the Canadian Encyclopedia

Canadian animation studios
Mass media companies established in 1976
WildBrain
OMERS
Television production companies of Canada
American animation studios
Entertainment companies established in 1976
Companies based in Toronto
Scandals in Canada
Children's television
Privately held companies of Canada
1976 establishments in Quebec
2012 mergers and acquisitions
Mass media companies disestablished in 2014
Companies based in Montreal